Bajraktarević is a predominantly Bosnian surname, an occupational surname derived from bajraktar, a Turkism meaning "flag-bearer". It is predominantly borne by ethnic Bosniaks, while the similar Barjaktarević is predominantly borne by ethnic Serbs. Notable people with the surname include:

Dina Bajraktarević (born 1953), Bosnian singer
Esmir Bajraktarevic (born 2005), American footballer of Bosnian descent
Mahmut Bajraktarević (1909–1985), Bosnian mathematician
Mirsada Bajraktarević (1951–1976), Bosnian singer
Mufad Muffe Bajraktarevic, Swedish futsal national Coach
Semir Bajraktarević (born 1987), Bosnian footballer
Silvana Armenulić (born Zilha Bajraktarević; 1939–1976), Bosnian singer
Téa Obreht (born Tea Bajraktarević) (born 1985), Serbian-American novelist

See also
Barjaktarević

Bosnian surnames
Occupational surnames